The Cresskill Public Schools are a comprehensive community public school district serve students in pre-kindergarten through twelfth grade from Cresskill in Bergen County, New Jersey, United States. The district is governed by a Board of Education and administered by a Superintendent of Schools, a School Business Administrator / Board Secretary and principals, as part of the district's staff of 180.

As of the 2018–19 school year, the district, comprised of four schools, had an enrollment of 1,790 students and 144.4 classroom teachers (on an FTE basis), for a student–teacher ratio of 12.4:1.

The district is classified by the New Jersey Department of Education as being in District Factor Group "I", the second-highest of eight groupings. District Factor Groups organize districts statewide to allow comparison by common socioeconomic characteristics of the local districts. From lowest socioeconomic status to highest, the categories are A, B, CD, DE, FG, GH, I and J.

Awards and recognition 
In Newsweek's May 22, 2007 issue, ranking the country's top high schools, Cresskill High School was listed in 209th place, the fifth-highest ranked school in New Jersey; the school had been ranked 202nd in the 2006 survey and in 93rd in 2005.

Cresskill High School was the 39th-ranked public high school in New Jersey out of 328 schools statewide, in New Jersey Monthly magazine's September 2012 cover story on the state's Top Public High Schools.

Schools 
Schools in the district (with 2018–19 enrollment data from the National Center for Education Statistics) are:
Elementary schools
Edward H. Bryan School with 477 students grades PreK-5
Erik Roth, Principal
Merritt Memorial School with 336 students in grades PreK-5
Sean Conlon, Principal
Middle school
Cresskill Middle School with 426 in grades 6-8
John Massaro, Principal
High school
Cresskill High School with 541 students in grades 9-12
John Massaro, Principal

Administration 
Core members of the district's administration are:
Michael Burke, Superintendent
Dawn Delasandro, Business Administrator / Board Secretary

Board of education
The district's board of education, comprised of nine members, sets policy and oversees the fiscal and educational operation of the district through its administration. As a Type II school district, the board's trustees are elected directly by voters to serve three-year terms of office on a staggered basis, with three seats up for election each year held (since 2012) as part of the November general election. The board appoints a superintendent to oversee the day-to-day operation of the district.

Other Information 
As of December 22, 2021, the Cresskill High School and Middle School which were damaged by Hurricane Ida are still under renovation.

References

External links 
Cresskill Public Schools

Cresskill Public Schools, National Center for Education Statistics

Cresskill, New Jersey
New Jersey District Factor Group I
School districts in Bergen County, New Jersey